Races of the Wild is an optional supplemental source book for the 3.5 edition of the Dungeons & Dragons roleplaying game.

Contents
Races of the Wild contains background information on the elves and halflings, introduces a race of winged humanoids called "raptorans," as well as giving rules for playing wilderness based creatures such as fey and centaurs as player characters.

Publication history
Races of the Wild was written by Skip Williams and published in February 2005.  Cover art was by Adam Rex, with interior art by Tom Baxa, Steve Belledin, Dennis Crabapple McClain, Wayne England, Matt Faulkner, Emily Fiegenschuh, Jeremy Jarvis, Chuck Lukacs, Larry MacDougal, Vinod Rams, Sam Wood, and James Zhang.

"One new twist on elves is self-sufficiency and nonspecialization," Skip Williams explained. "The long elven lifespan gives them plenty of time for learning to do things for themselves. Halflings lead something of a double life. Their wandering lifestyle obliges them to seem open and welcome to strangers, but they have secrets they keep to themselves."

Reprints and revisions
Races of Stone, Races of Destiny and Races of the Wild in the Dungeons & Dragons Races Gift Set, released in 2005.

Reception

Reviews

References

Dungeons & Dragons sourcebooks
Role-playing game supplements introduced in 2005